Psiadiella is a genus of Madagascarian plants in the aster tribe within the daisy family.

Species
The only known species is Psiadiella humilis.

References

Monotypic Asteraceae genera
Astereae
Endemic flora of Madagascar